Jiude is a metro station on the Green Line operated by Taichung Metro in Wuri District, Taichung, Taiwan.

The station name is taken from an old name of the area.

Station layout

References 

Taichung Metro
Railway stations opened in 2020